The following, lists events that happened during 1847 in Chile.

Incumbents
President of Chile: Manuel Bulnes

Events

September
17 September - The National Statistics Institute (Chile) is established.

Births
12 April - Aníbal Zañartu (d. 1902)
13 August - Luis Uribe (d. 1914)

Deaths
16 July - José Ignacio Zenteno (b. 1786)
8 November - José Ignacio Cienfuegos (b. 1762)

References 

 
1840s in Chile
Chile
Chile